The Craft Aerotech 200 is an American two-seat autogyro that was designed by Jack Craft and produced by Craft Aerotech of Missoula, Montana, United States. The autogyro was supplied as a kit for amateur construction and was also available as a plan.

Design and development
The Craft Aerotech 200 has a metal tube frame and a composite structure with two enclosed side by side seats. It has a single two-bladed rotor and is powered by two  Rotax 503 engines, mounted side-by-side in a pusher configuration. It has a fixed tricycle landing gear.

Specifications

See also

References

1990s United States sport aircraft
Autogyros
Homebuilt aircraft
Twin-engined pusher aircraft